Ophthalmia nodosa is a cutaneous condition characterized by inflammation of the eye due to lodging of (for example) caterpillar hairs in the conjunctiva, cornea, or iris.

See also 
 Bristleworm sting
 List of cutaneous conditions

References 

Parasitic infestations, stings, and bites of the skin